GAZ Group Bus Division is the business unit of the GAZ Group overseeing bus manufacturing. It combines several Russian bus manufacturing companies.

Starting in 2015, the GAZ Group has introduced a single brand for all its bus manufacturing subsidiaries, and newly manufactured vehicles now feature the deer badge of the GAZ company.

History

The division has its origins in a reorganization of the automotive companies owned by the Siberian Aluminum holding (later Basic Element), which were consolidated under the RusPromAvto consortium. RusPromAvto was created on 7 August 2000 and combined several Russian bus manufacturers. LiAZ was added to the group in 2001.

It became known as Russian Buses in May 2004, and was based in the village of Maliye Vyazemy in Moscow Oblast. In 2005, during the restructuring of the production assets of RusPromAvto, the company was incorporated into the GAZ Group.

Structure
Companies of the division:
 Kurgan Bus Factory (KAvZ)
 Pavlovo Bus Factory (PAZ)
 Likinsky Bus Factory (LiAZ)

Former companies
 Golitsynsky Bus Factory, the brand was discontinued in 2014 and the factory now makes agricultural machines.
 Kanashsky Auto Aggregate Factory (bus chassis producers.

References

External links
 Buses - GAZ Group

Bus manufacturers of Russia
Bus Division
Vehicle manufacturing companies established in 2000